Franklin Stevens may refer to:

Benjamin Franklin Stevens, bibliographer
Franklin-Stevens PS-2
Frank Stephens (advocate) (born 1981 or 1982, full name John Franklin Stephens), American disability advocate, actor and athlete

See also
Frank Stevens (disambiguation)
Frank Stephens (disambiguation)